Rosersberg Palace is one of the Royal Palaces of Sweden. Situated on the shores of Lake Mälaren, on the outskirts of Stockholm, it was built in the 1630s by the Oxenstierna family and became a royal palace in 1762, when the state gave it to Duke Karl (later Karl XIII), the younger brother of Gustav III of Sweden.

History 

Gabriel Bengtsson Oxenstierna named the palace after his mother, who came from the prestigious Tre Rosor ("Three Roses") family. Construction of the building in the typical Renaissance style of the time started in 1634 and was completed in 1638.

In the late 17th century, the Renaissance style was out of fashion and Oxenstierna's son, Bengt Oxenstierna, had it radically modernised in the then current Rococo style under the architect Nicodemus Tessin the Younger. The gables of the main building were demolished and the building was given a new roof. New wings and colonnaded gallery were added.

In 1747, Rosersberg was acquired by Baron Erland Carlsson Broman, and was again modernized with the assistance of the architect Jean Eric Rehn. Broman died in 1757, and the palace was acquired by the State, and given to Karl.

Karl took up residence in the palace and continued with Rehn's plans for modernizing it. It was renovated in the late Gustavian style but was lacking many of the more capricious aspects of the style, replacing them with a more serious and romantic tone which is referred to as the Karl XIII Empire style. As part of the modernisation a series of new interiors were created, the most notable of which are the Orange and Red drawing rooms, and the Hogland Room.

It was a favourite among the palaces for Karl XIV Johan and Queen Desideria, the first of the Bernadotte line, who spent their summers relaxing at Rosersberg and were the last royals to use the palace as a residence. Karl Johan's bedchamber is regarded as one of the most important examples of an early 19th-century Swedish interior. Nowadays, the rooms and collections are preserved very much as they were during the period 1795–1825.

After the death of Desideria in 1860, the palace was given to Swedish infantry. In 1874 the Swedish Infantry Gunnery School moved into the castle's ground floor and wings. In the spring of 1961, the Infantry Gunnery School was relocated to Linköping Garrison. On 1 July 1961 the castle was handed over to the Swedish Civil Defence Board. In 1986, the Civil Defence Board was reorganized into the Rescue Services Agency, which until 2006 had premises in the castle and castle wings. In the summer of 2008, Rosersberg Hotel and Conference opened a café and bed and breakfast.

Park 
The palace has a park which incorporates a French Baroque garden commissioned by Bengt Oxenstierna, and designed and planted at the end of the 17th century by Tessin the Younger. At the time it was considered one of the most lavish gardens in Sweden, but much of the garden has become overgrown or been lost. The avenues and a 600-metre (1,968 ft) pond still exist. On the left hand side of the palace is an English garden with winding paths commissioned by Duke Karl around 1800.

See also
 Architecture of Stockholm

References

External links

 Official website

Houses completed in 1638
Crown palaces in Sweden
Palaces in Stockholm
Castles in Stockholm County
Museums in Stockholm County
Historic house museums in Sweden
1638 establishments in Sweden